Sezer Sezgin (born 3 March 1986, Bakırköy) is a Turkish professional footballer who currently is a part of Kırklarelispor. His role is defender. He represented Turkey at U-20 level for 9 caps in 2005.

External links
 TFF Profile
 

1986 births
Living people
People from Bakırköy
Footballers from Istanbul
Turkish footballers
Turkey youth international footballers
Beşiktaş J.K. footballers
Karşıyaka S.K. footballers
Kayserispor footballers
Boluspor footballers
Samsunspor footballers
Kartalspor footballers
Giresunspor footballers
Aydınspor footballers
Eyüpspor footballers
Association football defenders